The International Socialist Alternative, formerly Socialist Left Party (SLP) is the Austrian section of International Socialist Alternative. The party originated in the 1980s, when the forerunner "Sozialistische Offensive Vorwärts" emerged from the far-left wing of the Socialist Youth of Austria. It later transformed itself during the protests against the participation of the FPÖ in the Austrian government in 2000 into SLP, forming itself as a party at a conference on January 30, 2000. In 2002, it ran in federal elections for the Nationalrat; however, it was unable to win a seat.

The ISA has several professed goals as part of their party plan for reform: social justice on a national and global level; a stop to the neo-liberal government's spending cuts and privatisation schemes; gender equality and equality for LGBTQAI+ persons; an end to Nazism, racism, and all forms of xenophobia; protection of the environment; as well as other topics relating to anti-globalisation. The party is also anti-EU on the basis of it serving only the interests of the ruling class. They however are in favour of a 'workers' EU' run in the interests of working people.

The ISA aims to help found an alternative to social democracy and what it terms the "bureaucratic-centralist" or "Stalinist" KPÖ. As a section of the International Socialist Alternative it has a Trotskyist analysis which rejects Stalinism as well the cultural revolution approach of Maoism. It also rejects social democracy, which it believes has become bourgeois. The ISA defines itself as a young, revolutionary pro-labour party.

In 2001, the party (under the then-name SLP) stood in elections in Vienna and received 100 voters, 0.01% of the vote in communal elections of 2001. However, since the SLP put itself up for votes in only one district (Zentrum), this equates to relatively 0.18% of all votes. The party campaigned also in other districts such as Margareten, where it received 139 votes, which totals to 0.68% of all votes.

In communal elections of 2005, the party campaigned again in the districts of Zentrum and Margareten. It was able to raise its votes to 124 in Zentrum (0.24% or 0.02% for all of Vienna); however, it lost in Margareten (90 votes, 0.47%). Because the SLP ran against the KPÖ in Margareten, their presence could have contributed to the narrow miss for the KPÖ in entering the communal assembly there, with their tally of 2.22%. The SLP also ran in Favoriten (0.19%) and Brigittenau (0.28%); however, neither result was enough to qualify for a seat.

In 2022, the SLP renamed itself to International Socialist Alternative, reflecting the character of the ISA as an international organisation.

Campaigns

Socialist Left Party activists have been prominent in defending abortion rights. In 2003, after writing an article criticizing the methods of anti-abortion group Human Life International (HLI), ISA member Claudia Sorger was taken to court, but won her case on July 10, 2003.

ISA members have also been prominent in a campaign at the Hellas Kagran football club against Martin Graf, a senior figure in the far-right FPÖ party, who was accused of using the training facilities for a party election rally. Lucia and Margarita Döller were suspended from playing for the club by an ally of Graf senior in the club for allegedly 'bringing the club into disrepute'. This included their participation in a demonstration against Graf being made the 3rd deputy speaker of Austrian parliament.

In addition, members of the AC Mauer U-18s, most prominently Sebastian Kugler, wore T-shirts protesting against this decision whilst warming up for a match against Hellas Kagran U-18s and were subsequently served with four-match suspensions by the Viennese Football Association. In a strange twist, the players were charged according to its rules regarding "racism and other prejudices", whilst the players facing disciplinary measures insist they were campaigning against a racist.

In the 2013 legislative election the party fielded a number of candidates that were legally unable to vote in Austria, in support of refugees.

References

External links
 

2000 establishments in Austria
Political parties established in 2000
Anti-fascist organizations
Anti-racist organizations in Europe
Communist parties in Austria
Eurosceptic parties in Austria
Austria
Trotskyist organizations in Europe